Essays and Aphorisms on the Higher Man is the work of the American writer and philosopher, Emile Benoit (writer). 

Benoit writes, "The evolution of the species will be when man can incorporate and digest all of his religions and live wholly, honestly and peacefully with himself and others…when he accepts all the religions, arts, and sciences as expressions of human greatness; a time when even the truth will no longer be an eternal proposition but simply an expression of mankind’s prominence at making the incomprehensible understood – if but only briefly." 

As Benoit writes in the preface of the book, his intention is "to inspire, rather than impose, to incite rather than allow man to settle into a comfortable repose, delighted with himself." The book has won critical acclaim from reviewers  as well as New York Times bestselling authors.

References 

Contemporary philosophical literature